This is a list of diseases of croton (Codiaeum variegatum) plants.

Bacterial diseases

Fungal diseases

References
Common Names of Diseases, The American Phytopathological Society

Croton diseases